Lido Bathing Complex is a large lido in São Martinho, Funchal, Madeira.

History

Opened in 1932, the complex had to be closed on 20 February 2010 due to the damage caused by the 2010 Madeira floods and mudslides. After extensive repairs were done, the complex reopened in late 2015.

References

Lidos
Tourist attractions in Madeira
Beaches of Madeira
Swimming venues in Portugal